Thisizima ceratella is a moth of the family Tineidae. It is found in India, Burma, Thailand, western Malaysia and on the Anambas Islands.

References

Moths described in 1864
Tineidae